The 2003 G.I. Joe's 200 was the eighth round of the 2003 CART World Series season, held on June 22, 2003 at Portland International Raceway in Portland, Oregon.

Qualifying results

*Ryan Hunter-Reay's time in the first qualification session was disallowed after the car was found to be underweight during tech inspection.
**Tiago Montiero did not set a time in the second qualification session after his gearbox failed on his first lap.

Race

Caution flags

Notes

 New Race Record Adrian Fernández 1:56:16.626
 Average Speed 101.602 mph

External links
 Full Weekend Times & Results

Portland
Grand Prix of Portland